Daifallah Masadeh (1938 – 18 December 2015) was a Jordanian lawyer and politician. He served as Minister of State for Legal Affairs between 2000 and 2001.

In 1971 he founded the D.Masadeh law firm.

References

1938 births
2015 deaths
20th-century Jordanian lawyers
State ministers of Jordan